Phumelela Local Municipality is an administrative area in the Thabo Mofutsanyane District of the Free State in South Africa. The name "Phumelela" means "to succeed" in isiZulu.

Main places
The 2001 census divided the municipality into the following main places:

Politics 

The municipal council consists of sixteen members elected by mixed-member proportional representation. Eight councillors are elected by first-past-the-post voting in eight wards, while the remaining eight are chosen from party lists so that the total number of party representatives is proportional to the number of votes received. In the 2021 South African municipal elections the African National Congress (ANC) won a reduced majority of eleven seats on the council.

The following table shows the results of the election.

References

External links
 Official website

Local municipalities of the Thabo Mofutsanyane District Municipality